The Cabinet Seehofer II was the state government of the German state of Bavaria from 10 October 2013 to 20 March 2018. The Cabinet was headed by Prime Minister Horst Seehofer and was a one-party government.
Cabinet members hold the office of Ministers of their respective portfolio, except denoted otherwise. It was replaced by the Cabinet Söder.

Composition 

|}

References

Seehofer II
Cabinets established in 2013
Cabinets disestablished in 2018
2013 establishments in Germany
2018 disestablishments in Germany